Barrow Hill is a small settlement in Dorset, England, situated in the East Dorset administrative district on the A350 road approximately  northwest of Poole. It lies between Lytchett Matravers (in the neighbouring Purbeck District) and Corfe Mullen, though is in the civil parish of Sturminster Marshall.

Villages in Dorset